Hoseynabad-e Zeh Kalut (also Romanized as Ḩoseynābād-e Zeh Kalūt; also known as Ḩoseynābād) is a village in Jazmurian Rural District, Jazmurian District, Rudbar-e Jonubi County, Kerman Province, Iran. At the 2006 census, its population was 1,213, in 225 families.

References 

Populated places in Rudbar-e Jonubi County